Paul Terence Cooper (born 12 July 1957 in Birmingham) is an English former professional footballer who played as a defender in the Football League for Huddersfield Town and Grimsby Town.

References

1957 births
Living people
Footballers from Birmingham, West Midlands
English footballers
Association football defenders
English Football League players
Huddersfield Town A.F.C. players
Grimsby Town F.C. players
Nuneaton Borough F.C. players
Place of birth missing (living people)